Utabaenetes is a genus of insects in the family Rhaphidophoridae. It is monotypic, containing the single species Utabaenetes tanneri, commonly known as Tanner's black camel cricket, that is endemic to the desert of San Rafael Swell in the western United States.

References

Endemic fauna of the United States
Insects described in 1970
Ensifera genera
Rhaphidophoridae
Taxonomy articles created by Polbot
Monotypic Orthoptera genera